Fort Supply may refer to: 

 Fort Supply (Oklahoma), a former US military post (1868–1895)
 Fort Supply, Oklahoma, a town in Woodward County, Oklahoma
 Fort Supply Lake, a lake in Woodward County, Oklahoma
 Fort Supply (Utah Territory), a former Mormon settlement (1853–1857) in modern-day Wyoming